Ivelina Taleva (born 25 March 1977) is a Bulgarian gymnast. She competed at the 1996 Summer Olympics in Atlanta where she received a silver medal in the rhythmic group competition. Ivelina has 6 gold medals (1 from ECH Bucuresti - 1993, 1 from WCH Paris - 1994, 1 from ECH Prague - 1995, 2 from WCH Vienna - 1995, 1 from WCH Budapest - 1996), 
9 silver (1 from WCH Athens, 1 from ECH Stuttgart, 2 from ECH Bucurest, 1 from WCH Paris, 2 from ECH Prague, 1 from WCH Vienna and 1 from Olympic Games Atlanta - 1996) 
and 2 bronze medals (WCH Paris and ECH Lisbon)

References

 rg-levski.eu
 

1977 births
Living people
Bulgarian rhythmic gymnasts
Gymnasts at the 1996 Summer Olympics
Olympic gymnasts of Bulgaria
Olympic silver medalists for Bulgaria
Olympic medalists in gymnastics
Medalists at the 1996 Summer Olympics
Medalists at the Rhythmic Gymnastics World Championships